Al-Jāmiʿah al-Ahliyyah Dār al-ʿUlūm Muʿīn al-Islām, popularly known as the Hāṭhazārī Madrasa or the Great Madrassah, is a Qawmi institution of Hathazari, located in Bangladesh's Chittagong District. Established in 1901, it is the largest and oldest Deobandi seminary in the country. According to a 2009 National Bureau of Asian Research report, the highly reputed institution ranks among top ten madrasa in the subcontinent.

History

Al-Jamiatul Ahlia Darul Ulum Moinul Islam was first established in 1896 CE. It was moved to its present location in Hathazari, Bangladesh in 1901. The Jamiah introduces the Islamic education and Reformation movement in this region. A few ulama of the Chittagong region took the decision to establish the madrasa in accordance to the constitution of Darul Uloom Deoband in North India. To apply this decision, Habibullah Qurayshi along with Abdul Wahid Bengali, Sufi Azizur Rahman and Abdul Hamid Madarshahi established the madrasah.

The Hathazari Madrasah became "arguably the most reputable Quomi madrasa in the country."

Starting in 2004, the Hathazari Madrasa has been at the centre of media attention due to allegations that it is a haven for "terrorist" training. This is the first time in the institution's long history that such allegations have been made against the madrasah itself.

In February 2010, 40 students were arrested for clashing with police and later released. Students had snatched a service rifle.

Organization and administration
The Darul Ulum has divided its education system into six major levels:
 Primary level – Urdu; Persian; Arabic; Nahu-Sarf; Siraat-un-Nabi; Fiqh etc. are taught along with the mathematics; history; Bengali; English and geography.
 Secondary level – higher Arabic grammar; Arabic literature; Fiqh; logic.
 Higher secondary level – higher Fiqh and Usul-e-Fiqh; higher logic; higher Arabic literature; higher economics; higher philosophy; higher Islam history.
 Graduate level – Hadith; Tafsir; Arabic and Persian poetry; solar science.
 Post graduate level – six major Hadith Books: Bukhari Sharif, Muslim Sharif, Abu Dawd Sharif, Tirmidi Sharif, Nasaee Sharif and Ibn Majah are mainly taught.
 Beyond post graduate level – further study in the field of Islamic law; Arabic language and literature; higher Hadith study, Bengali literature and Islamic studies.

Network of schools
The "Boro Madrassah" is one of the three large madrasahs, along with Al-Jamiah Al-Islamiah in Patiya, and Jamiatul Uloom Al-Islamia Lalkhan Bazar, that together control over 7000 smaller schools in Bangladesh. The three schools are closely coordinated.

student protest

Publications

Alleged militancy
There are allegations that the Madrassah is a training ground for Islamic extremists. While authorities of the school have confirmed that some graduates volunteered for the Afghan jihad during the 1980s, there was no strong evidence to suggest that the school itself was recruiting for the jihad.

The rector of the school, Maulana Ahmad Shafi—popularly known as "Boro Huzur" (the eldest scholar)—is also the chairman of a faction of the political party Islami Oikya Jote. Critics of the party say that membership of IOJ coincides with the Harkat-ul-Jihad al-Islami (HuJI), though a leading Bangladeshi political scientist warns little is actually known about their organisation.

Rector Ahmad is also purported to be the leader of a group called "Hifazat-e-Islam," which he claims to be a peaceful organisation.

Ahmad and his colleagues state that the group is for protesting the government's decisions to introduce a secular education system.  A statement from the police mentions that men, suspected to be from Hifazat-e-Islam, fired gunshots and threw homemade bombs on the police, causing injuries to 5 or 6 police constables. It is unclear whether or not these actions were approved by Ahmad Shafi.

Alumni scholars

The Jamiah Darul Ulum Moinul Islam has produced a large number of notable scholars.
 Shah Ahmad Hasan
 Mufti Faizullah
 Faqihul Millat Mufti Abdur Rahman
 Ashraf Ali Bishwanathi
 Allama Shah Ahmad Shafi
 Mufti Mizanur Rahman Sayed
 Mufti Izharul Islam
 Junaid Babunagari
 Nurul Islam Jihadi
 Sajidur Rahman
 Zia Uddin

References

External Link

Darul Uloom Hathazari
Qawmi madrasas of Bangladesh
Deobandi Islamic universities and colleges
1896 establishments in India